Badri Narayan Patra (born 14 November 1943) is a politician from Odisha, India. He represents the Ghasipura (Odisha Vidhan Sabha constituency) since the year 2009.

He first time elected as MLA in the Year 1990 second time in 2000 then after 2009, 2014 and 2019 general election.

In the time of his ministry, Ghasipura and Keonjhar districts made many historical achievements,
like road connectivity, electrification, drinking water project, river bridge and so much.

He formerly was a Lecturer in economics .. ex-CM Odisha Biju Patanaik brought to politics.

References

Living people
People from Kendujhar district
Odisha politicians
Biju Janata Dal politicians
State cabinet ministers of Odisha
Odisha MLAs 2019–2024
1943 births